The term  emotional affair describes a type of relationship between people. The term often describes a bond between two people that mimics or matches the closeness and emotional intimacy of a romantic relationship while not being physically consummated.  An emotional affair is sometimes referred to as an affair of the heart. An emotional affair may emerge from a friendship, and progress toward greater levels of personal intimacy and attachment. 

Examples of specific behaviors include confiding personal information and turning to the other person during moments of vulnerability or need. However, nearly all friendships serve these roles to some degree. The intimacy between the people involved usually stems from a friendship with confidence to tell each other intimate aspects of themselves, their relationships, or even subjects they would not discuss with their partners.  It is disputed whether this is inappropriate.  Indeed, forbidding your partner from maintaining and participating in close friendships is a common feature of coercive control. High levels of platonic emotional intimacy in adults may occur without the participants being bound by other intimate relationships or may occur between people in other relationships as a normal course of life.

Definition
An emotional affair can be defined as:  "A relationship between a person and someone other than (their) spouse that affects the level of intimacy, emotional distance and overall dynamic balance in the marriage. The role of an affair is to create emotional distance in the marriage."  In this view, neither sexual intercourse nor physical affection is necessary to affect the committed relationship(s) of those involved in the affair. It is theorized that an emotional affair can injure a committed relationship more than a one night stand or other casual sexual encounters.  

Such closeness can also be a reaction to separate injury in the relationship, and indeed can be utilized to resolve the injury and heal the primary relationship.

Incidence and prevalence
Research by Glass & Wright found that men's extramarital relationships were more sexual and women's more emotional. For both genders, sexual and emotional extramarital involvement occurred in those with the greatest marital dissatisfaction.

Chaste and emotionally intimate affairs tend to be more common than sexually intimate affairs. Shirley Glass reported in Not "Just Friends" that, among those who claim to have had an affair, 44% of husbands and 57% of wives indicated they had a strong emotional involvement with the subject of the affair without intercourse.

In University of Chicago surveys conducted by the National Opinion Research Center (NORC) between 1990 and 2002, 27% of people who reported being happy in marriage admitted to having an extramarital affair. The meaning and definition of what infidelity constitutes often varies depending on the person asked. Sexual feelings in an emotional affair may be denied to maintain the illusion that it is just a special friendship. Affair surveys are unlikely to explore what is denied. Many people in affair surveys are not honest with themselves nor with the interviewer.  Along with the possibility of these phenomena being underrepresented, this raises the possibility that it is being overrepresented, and the actual prevalence may be lower than indicated.

Characteristics 

This type of affair is often characterized by:
 Unexpected emotional intimacy. The partner being unfaithful may spend inappropriate or excessive time with someone of the opposite or same gender (time not shared with the other partner). They may confide more in their new "friend" than in their partner and may share more intimate emotional feelings and secrets with their new partner than with their existing spouse. Any time that an individual invests more emotionally into a relationship with someone besides their partner the existing partnership may suffer.
 Deception and secrecy. Those involved may not tell their partners about the amount of time they spend with each other. An individual involved in this type of affair may, for example, tell their spouse that they are doing other activities when they are really meeting with someone else. Or the unfaithful spouse may exclude any mention of the other person while discussing the day’s activities to conceal the rendezvous. Even if no physical intimacy occurs, the deception shows that those involved believe they are doing something that undermines the existing relationship, whether because they feel the action is inherently wrong, or because they fear retribution from an unnecessarily jealous partner.
 Increased fighting. When a person becomes emotionally involved with someone and do not recognize it as a valid feeling, they may begin to channel their anger and disgust to diverse relationships, or to interpret different relationships in a dichotomized manner. This person may also rationalize a cause to something or someone, which can lead to increased fighting and strain on the relationships.
 Sexual and emotional chemistry. Sexual and emotional chemistry can present itself based on a physical attraction one might feel for another person. This may or may not lead to physical intimacy.
 Denial. Denial of the attraction and limerence felt may be exhibited by the cheating partner, but a similar denial and minimisation may also be defensively deployed by the excluded partner as well, to avoid confrontation.

Cultural examples
In Casanova's Chinese Restaurant, the composer Hugh Moreland, talking of an unlikely couple experiencing love at first sight, denies that they are having an affair: "You can have a passion for someone without having an affair. That is one of the things no one seems able to understand these days...one of those fascinating mutual attractions between improbable people that take place from time to time.  I should like to write a ballet around it."

Therapy as subset
The entrance of a therapist into a couple's dynamics may be problematic. It may be experienced by the non-client partner as the client having an emotional affair with the therapist if the client is perceived as granting the therapist a greater degree of intimacy and confiding than they grant the client's partner. The tendency to create a mate-substitute out of the therapist may be especially acute in incest survivors.

See also

Notes

References 
 Pittman, F. (1989). Private Lies. New York: W. W. Norton Co.
 
 Vaughan, P. (1989). The Monogamy Myth. New York: New Market Press.
 Mathews, J. (2008) "Dating a Married Man: Memoirs from the Other Women"  Amazon.com

Intimate relationships
Emotion